Forkhead box O3, also known as FOXO3 or FOXO3a, is a human protein encoded by the FOXO3 gene.

Function 

FOXO3 belongs to the O subclass of the forkhead family of transcription factors which are characterized by a distinct fork head DNA-binding domain. There are three other FoxO family members in humans, FOXO1, FOXO4 and FOXO6. These transcription factors share the ability to be inhibited and translocated out of the nucleus on phosphorylation by proteins such as Akt/PKB in the PI3K signaling pathway (aside from FOXO6, which may be constitutively nuclear). Other post-translational modifications including acetylation and methylation are seen and can result in increased or altered FOXO3a activity.

The use of FOXO3a knockout mice has revealed a diverse range of functions in both health and disease, namely infertility, lymphoproliferation, adenoma, organ inflammation, metabolism etc.; yet despite the purported importance of FOXO transcription factors in aging, FOXO3A knockout mice do not show an obvious shortening of lifespan or accelerated aging

Apoptosis 

Yu & Fellows et al. (2018) demonstrated that FOXO3a activation in vascular smooth muscle cells induces prominent apoptosis and extracellular matrix breakdown in vitro and exacerbates atherosclerosis and vascular remodelling in vivo. Also, these processes were at least partially dependent on MMP-13, as shown by siRNA knockdown and specific pharmacological inhibition. Further experiments also revealed MMP-13 as a novel, bona fide transcriptional target gene of FOXO3a in VSMCs.

FOXO3a also functions as a trigger for apoptosis through upregulation of genes necessary for cell death, such as Bim and PUMA, or downregulation of anti-apoptotic proteins such as FLIP.

Stem cells 

Gopinath et al. (2014) demonstrate a functional requirement for FOXO3 as a regulator of Notch signaling pathway (an essential regulator of quiescence in adult stem cells) in the self-renewal of stem cells during muscle regeneration.

It is thought that FOXO3a is also involved in protection from oxidative stress by upregulating antioxidants such as catalase and MnSOD. Ron DePinho's group generated Foxo3 knockout mice, and showed that female exhibit a dramatic age-dependent infertility, due to premature ovarian failure.

Clinical significance 

Deregulation of FOXO3a is involved in tumorigenesis, for example translocation of this gene with the MLL gene is associated with secondary acute leukemia. Downregulation of FOXO3a activity is often seen in cancer (e.g. by increase in Akt activity resulting from loss of PTEN). FOXO3 is known as a tumour suppressor.

Alternatively spliced transcript variants encoding the same protein have been observed.

The ketone body β-hydroxybutyrate has been shown in mice to increase gene expression of FOXO3a by histone deacetylase inhibition, upon which FOXO3a transcriptionally increased gene expression of the antioxidant enzymes SOD2 and catalase. Plasma levels of β-hydroxybutyrate increase with fasting or a ketogenic diet.

Association with longevity 

Genetic variation in FOXO3 has been shown to be associated with healthspan and longevity in humans. It is found in most centenarians across a variety of ethnic groups around the world.  The homologous genes daf-16 in the nematode C. elegans and dFOXO in the fruit fly are also associated with longevity in those organisms. Mice lacking FOXO3 do not show obvious accelerated aging or shortened lifespan.

Association with intelligence 

In a meta-analysis of 78,308 individuals of European descent, a particular single nucleotide polymorphism (SNP) (rs2490272) in an intronic region of FOXO3 and neighboring SNPs in the promoter region, had the strongest associations with intelligence. Various types of tests had been used to measure intelligence.

See also 
 FOX proteins
 Daf-16

References

Further reading 

 
 
 
 
 
 
 
 
 
 
 
 
 
 
 
 
 
 
 
 
 ；chih长此人十二厂二

External links 
 

Forkhead transcription factors
Aging-related proteins